Cleistesiopsis bifaria, the smaller spreading pogonia, is a terrestrial species of orchid native to the eastern United States, along the Appalachian Mountains from West Virginia to Alabama.

References

External links
 

North American Orchid Conservation Center, Go Orchids:  Cleistesiopsis bifaria (Small Spreading Pogonia)

Pogonieae
Orchids of the United States
Orchids of Kentucky
Endemic flora of the United States
Flora of the Appalachian Mountains
Flora of the Southeastern United States
Plants described in 1946
Flora without expected TNC conservation status